The Magnolia Hotel (sometimes called the Magnolia Building, originally the Magnolia Petroleum Building) is a 29-story, Beaux-Arts style, upscale hotel in the Main Street District of downtown Dallas, Texas, that for many years was the tallest building in the state after surpassing the Adolphus Hotel. The structure is a Dallas Landmark and is listed on the National Register of Historic Places.

History
The building, which opened next door to the Adolphus Hotel in August 1922 at a cost of US $4 million, was originally the headquarters for the Magnolia Petroleum Company. In 1934, the company erected its trademark neon Pegasus on the building's roof (the Pegasus logo later became the logo of Mobil Oil who merged with Magnolia Petroleum in 1959) to celebrate the American Petroleum Institute's annual meeting, held in Dallas for the first time.  The rotating winged horse came to represent the city of Dallas and became one of its most recognizable and endearing landmarks, even after the building became obscured by much larger skyscrapers (the neon Pegasus can now only be seen in the downtown skyline approaching from the south).

By 1974, however, Pegasus stopped rotating due to mechanical problems and in 1977 the property was sold to the city of Dallas. The building was listed in the National Register of Historic Places in 1978.

The building was purchased by Denver, Colorado developers in 1997 and was converted into the luxury 330-room Magnolia Hotel.

In 1999, in preparation for Dallas's Millennium Celebration, Pegasus was taken down to be completely restored. However, the sign was beyond repair and a new sign was recreated from scratch. At midnight on 1 January 2000, the new Pegasus, complete with rotation, was lit for the first time.  A copy of the  original sign, which sat atop a Mobil Oil station in the Casa Linda neighborhood of Dallas for many decades, is now on display at the Old Red Museum.

Gallery

See also

List of buildings and structures in Dallas, Texas
National Register of Historic Places listings in Dallas County, Texas
Recorded Texas Historic Landmarks in Dallas County
List of Dallas Landmarks

References

External links

Magnolia Hotels, the company that owns and operates the Dallas Magnolia
Dallas City Hall's page on the Magnolia Building
Restoration of the Pegasus sign
Architectural facts

Skyscraper hotels in Dallas
Office buildings completed in 1923
National Register of Historic Places in Dallas
Recorded Texas Historic Landmarks
Dallas Landmarks
Beaux-Arts architecture in Texas
ExxonMobil buildings and structures
Hotel buildings on the National Register of Historic Places in Texas